Torment (Italian: Tormento) is a 1950 Italian melodrama film directed by Raffaello Matarazzo and starring Amedeo Nazzari, Yvonne Sanson and Annibale Betrone. The film's sets were designed by Ottavio Scotti. It was part of a group of popular melodramas featuring Nazzari and Sanson that were released in the post-war years.

Cast
 Amedeo Nazzari as Carlo Guarnieri  
 Yvonne Sanson as Anna Ferrari  
 Annibale Betrone as Gaetano Ferrari  
 Mario Ferrari as L'avvocato Bianchi  
 Teresa Franchini as Rosina  
 Tina Lattanzi as Matilde Ferrari  
 Aldo Nicodemi as Ruffini  
 Giuditta Rissone as Madre Celeste  
 Vittorio Sanipoli as Rossi, un socio di Carlo  
 Roberto Murolo as Enzo Sandri  
 Rosalia Randazzo as Pinuccia 
 Rita Livesi

References

Bibliography 
 Bayman, Louis. The Operatic and the Everyday in Postwar Italian Film Melodrama. Edinburgh University Press, 2014.

External links 
 

1952 films
Italian drama films
1952 drama films
1950s Italian-language films
Films directed by Raffaello Matarazzo
Films set in Naples
Melodrama films
Italian black-and-white films
1950s Italian films